James Hague (17 September 1834 – 16 August 1916) was an Australian politician who represented the South Australian House of Assembly multi-member seat of Barossa from 1890 to 1902. He represented the National Defence League in 1893 and 1896.

Hague was born in Manchester, England and emigrated to the colony of South Australia in 1855.

References

1834 births
1916 deaths
Members of the South Australian House of Assembly
English emigrants to colonial Australia
Politicians from Manchester